Fatma Shanan is a Druze painter from Israel.

Biography
Fatma Shanan was born in 1986 and grew up in Julis, Israel. As a kid she attended private art lessons due to the lack of art courses in her elementary school's curriculum. She studied visual arts at the Oranim Academic College from 2007 to 2010. Afterwards she studied in the studio of traditionalist Israeli artist Elie Shamir for a year. She lives and works between Tel Aviv and Julis.

Shanan is known for her figurative oil paintings of scenes of Druze villages and is inspired by 19th and 20th century realism. Almost all of her paintings are derived from staged photographs, which utilize family and friends as models. Many of her pieces feature traditional Eastern carpets, which contrast with her Western landscapes. The image of the oriental carpet is prominent in the Druze culture and common in most households. The carpet serves as an object of prayer, which must stay clean and not be stepped on. The maintenance of the carpet is often a job attended to by a woman. Her work primarily deals with identity through the representation of figures in domestic and public spheres. She especially focuses on her identity as women within her community and how that has impacted her life, aspiring to develop more fluidity between genders and other demographics.

She has also produced several self-portraits, which similarly contain carpet patterns or other objects showing identity. One piece, titled "Floating Self Portrait" depicts Shanan levitating over a carpet, which was developed from a video she took in the Metropolitan Museum of Art.

Exhibitions
Fatma Shanan held solo and group exhibitions in galleries and museums around the world, including solo exhibitions in Tel Aviv Museum of Art, Zemack Contemporary Art, and Umm al-Fahm Art Gallery. She has participated in many group exhibitions including ones at the Museum of Islamic Art in Jerusaelm, Janco Dada Museum, Bloomfield Science Museum, The Mediterranean Biennale in Sakhnin, Fresh Paint art fair and Alfred Institute for Contemporary Art.

Collections
Fatma Shanan's works are part of collection of Israel Museum in Jerusalem.

Awards

 2010   Prize for the Encouragement of Further Artistic Creation, The Art Institute, Oranim Academic College, Kiryat Tivon
 2010   Excellency Award, The America-Israel Cultural Foundation
2013   Homebase Project artist’s grant
2014   Grant for catalogue publication, Israel National Lottery
2014   Artist in the Community Prize, Ministry of Culture and Sport 
 2016   The Yehoshua Rabinovich Foundation for the Arts’ Grant, Tel Aviv
 2016   Haim Shiff Prize for Figurative-Realist Art, Tel Aviv Museum of Art
 2017   The Ministry of Culture award for the young artist

External links 
 Fatma Shanan

References

Israeli painters
Israeli women painters
Israeli Druze
Living people
1986 births
People from Julis
21st-century women artists